Harold Mechelynck (1 July 1924 – September 2013) was a Belgian field hockey player. He competed at the 1948 Summer Olympics and the 1952 Summer Olympics.

References

External links
 

1924 births
2013 deaths
Belgian male field hockey players
Olympic field hockey players of Belgium
Field hockey players at the 1948 Summer Olympics
Field hockey players at the 1952 Summer Olympics
Sportspeople from Ghent